Louis Clarizio, Jr. (born September 21, 1931) is one of the six white professional baseball players signed to play in the Negro leagues, the second ever signed.  He played in the Negro American League. He was signed to the Chicago American Giants in 1950 by Ted "Double Duty" Radcliffe with the support of the team's owner, Dr. J. B. Martin, who was concerned about black players joining Major League teams.

See also
 List of Negro league baseball players

References

1931 births
Chicago American Giants players
American people of Italian descent
People from Schaumburg
Living people